The FIBT World Championships 1996 took place in Calgary, Alberta, Canada for a second time, hosting the event previously in 1992 (Skeleton). It marked the first time the bobsleigh and skeleton competition took place in the same location at the championships since 1982.

Two man bobsleigh

Four man bobsleigh

Men's skeleton

Medal table

References
2-Man bobsleigh World Champions
4-Man bobsleigh World Champions
Men's skeleton World Champions

1996
1996 in Canadian sports
1996 in bobsleigh
1996 in skeleton
International sports competitions hosted by Canada
Bobsleigh in Canada